Linda Rui Feng is a Chinese-Canadian writer and academic, whose debut novel Swimming Back to Trout River was longlisted for the 2021 Giller Prize.

Born in Shanghai, China, she lived in the United States for several years before moving to Toronto, Ontario, where she is a professor of Chinese cultural history at the University of Toronto. She previously published the academic work City of Marvel and Transformation: Changan and Narratives of Experience in Tang Dynasty China in 2015.

References

External links

Chinese non-fiction writers
21st-century Chinese novelists
21st-century Chinese women writers
21st-century Canadian non-fiction writers
21st-century Canadian novelists
21st-century Canadian women writers
Chinese women non-fiction writers
Chinese women novelists
Chinese emigrants to Canada
Canadian women non-fiction writers
Canadian women novelists
Academic staff of the University of Toronto
Living people
Canadian writers of Asian descent
Year of birth missing (living people)